Mousa Zargar (Persian: موسی زرگر) (1935-12 March 2020) was an Iranian politician, physician, and general surgeon. He was assigned as the second minister of health of Iran after revolution.

References

1935 births
2020 deaths
Iranian politicians